The Inca jay or querrequerre (Cyanocorax yncas) is a bird species of the New World jays, which is native to the Andes of South America.

Taxonomy
The Inca jay was described by the French polymath Georges-Louis Leclerc, Comte de Buffon in 1775 in his Histoire Naturelle des Oiseaux. The bird was also illustrated in a hand-coloured plate engraved by François-Nicolas Martinet in the Planches Enluminées D'Histoire Naturelle which was produced under the supervision of Edme-Louis Daubenton to accompany Buffon's text.  Neither the plate caption nor Buffon's description included a scientific name but in 1783 the Dutch naturalist Pieter Boddaert coined the binomial name Corvus yncas in his catalogue of the Planches Enluminées. Buffon's specimen came from Peru; in 1953 the American ornithologist John Todd Zimmer restricted the type location to Chilpes, Department of Junín. The Inca jay is now one of 17 species placed in the genus Cyanocorax that was introduced by the German zoologist Friedrich Boie in 1826. The name of the genus is from Ancient Greek kuanos "dark-blue" and korakos "raven". The specific epithet yncas is from Incas, the inhabitants of Peru in pre-Columbian America.

Five subspecies are recognised:
  C. y. galeatus (Ridgway, 1900) – west central Colombia
  C. y. cyanodorsalis Dubois, AJC, 1874 – central and east Colombia, northwest Venezuela
  C. y. guatimalensis (Bonaparte, 1850) – north Venezuela
  C. y. yncas (Boddaert, 1783) – southwest Colombia, east Ecuador, Peru to central Bolivia
  C. y. longirostris (Carriker, 1933) – Marañon Valley (north Peru)

Some ornithologists treat the green jay of North America and the Inca jay as conspecific and with C. yncas luxuosus as the green jay and C. yncas yncas as the Inca jay.

Description

The crown can appear mostly white, with blue limited to the frontal crest and nape. A black bib forms a broad band up to the sides of the head as well as a stripe through the eye line and one above it. The breast and underparts typically are bright yellow. The upper parts are rich green. The color of the iris is bright yellow.

Voice
As with most of the typical jays, this species has a very extensive voice repertoire. The bird's most common call makes a  sound, but many other unusual notes also occur. One of the most distinctive calls sounds like an alarm bell.

Distribution and habitat
The range extends southwards in the Andes from the Colombia and Venezuela through Ecuador, Peru, and Bolivia.

Behaviour and ecology

Breeding
Inca jays usually build a nest in a tree or in a thorny bush or thicket, and the female lays three to five eggs. Only the female incubates, but both parents take care of the young. In Colombia, Inca jays are recorded as retaining offspring for several years, and those young help the parents raise more chicks. In Venezuela, they have been observed being victims of nest parasitism by giant cowbirds.

Feeding
Their basic diet consists of arthropods, vertebrates, seeds, and fruit.

References

External links

Green Jay videos on the Internet Bird Collection
Stamps (for Belize, Venezuela) (shows RangeMap)
Green Jay photo gallery VIREO

Inca Jay
Tool-using animals
Birds of the Northern Andes
Inca jay
Inca jay